Simmers is an English language surname and a patronymic from Summer. Notable people with the name include:

Bren Simmers (1976), Canadian poet
Brian Simmers (1940), former Scotland international rugby union player
Chris Simmers (1969), Scottish former rugby union player
Max Simmers (1904–1972), Scottish rugby union player
Tertuis Simmers (1983), South African politician
William Simmers (footballer) (1865–1950), Scottish footballer

English-language surnames